The Mars Excursion Module (MEM) was a spacecraft proposed by NASA in the 1960s for use in a human mission to Mars, and this can refer to any number of studies by corporations and spaceflight centers for Mars landers. However, primarily a MEM referred to a combination of a Manned Mars lander, short-stay surface habitat, and Mars ascent stage. Variations on a MEM included spacecraft designs like an uncrewed Mars surface cargo delivery, and there was a MEM lander that combined a communications center, living habitat, and laboratory.

A MEM formed part of Mars orbit rendezvous (MOR) and flyby-rendezvous mission profiles studied at NASA's Manned Spacecraft Center in the 1960s. A Mars Excursion Module would have been a combination of a Mars lander, short-stay surface habitat, and ascent vehicle; the ascent stage performed the rendezvous. One design for a MEM would have been used for a 40-day stay on the Martian surface in the flyby-rendezvous mission profile or for a 10- to 40-day stay in the MOR profiles. There was also a descent-only uncrewed MEM for delivering cargo, like a rover to the surface of Mars. Another MEM cargo lander variant would deliver a nuclear reactor to support the surface operations, and there was another with a communications, living quarters and lab in one landing-only MEM unit.

In the early 1960s, NASA contracted Philco Corporation to design a Mars Excursion Module for a Mars mission for the early 1970s. The basic requirements were for a crew of two, one US ton of science hardware, and to support 40 days of surface operation on Mars. Another MEM from this period was the Ames contracted TRW MEM, a design which weighed 11.4 metric tons but was designed for Mars atmosphere which had 10% of Earth's. The TRW MEM would support 10 days on the surface.
 
The hull would have consisted of columbium and nickel alloy. The MEM's descent stage would have served as the launch pad for liftoff of the ascent stage, as with the Apollo Lunar Module.

A Mars Excursion Module was discussed as a possibility in the Space Task Group Report of 1969, with a development decision required in FY 1974 for a 1981 Mars mission or in FY 1978 for a 1986 mission.

The watershed moment for mission planning was July 1965, when Mariner IV returned more accurate atmospheric data about Mars. This ruled out many of the lifting body and glider designs that were being considered based on estimates of a thicker Mars atmosphere than revealed by Mariner IV. 

Philco Aeronutronic Mars Excursion Module; this had a lifting body and had to be re-evaluated when the new data came in. 
Ames-TRW MEM
Project Deimos MEM 
Marshall Space Flight Center MEM by Woodcock after Mariner IV data, had a more Apollo-like "gumdrop" style design. 

Gordon Woodcock at the NASA Marshal Space Flight Center worked on the basis of a thinner Mars atmosphere (0.5 percent of Earth's), and developed design for a MEM, and also a pure-lander variant that would deliver a pressurized crewed Mars rover called Molab.

Cultural impact
 "One Way To The Moon", a 1966 episode of The Time Tunnel, featured a Mars Excursion Module launched in 1978. Mars Excursion Modules are also featured in Stephen Baxter's novel Voyage, an alternate history of space exploration in which NASA astronauts land on Mars in 1986 in a MEM named "Challenger" which was based on a North American Rockwell design proposal.
 The 1975 Year Two Space: 1999 episode "The Taybor" features a spacecraft, the SS Emporium, modeled by Martin Bower, which was clearly inspired to the MEM. The spaceship, symbolizing innovation (just like the MEM), was the first spacecraft in the series which could reach FTL velocities thanks to an extraterrestrial "Jump Drive".
 It is probable that the MEM inspired the Ares program Mars Ascent Vehicle (MAV) and Mars Descent Vehicle (MDV) in Andy Weir's 2011 novel The Martian (later adapted into a theatrical film).

See also
Lander (spacecraft)
Manned Mars rover
Mars habitat
Mars suit

References

External links

An Initial Concept Of A Manned Mars Excursion Vehicle For A Tenuous Mars Atmosphere (1966)

Crewed spacecraft
Human missions to Mars